Ratečevo Brdo is a small village in the hills north of Ilirska Bistrica in the Inner Carniola region of Slovenia.

The local church in the settlement is dedicated to the Virgin Mary and belongs to the Parish of Zagorje.

References

External links
Ratečevo Brdo on Geopedia

Populated places in the Municipality of Ilirska Bistrica